Pravrajika Mokshaprana (9 December 1915 Calcutta – 30 August 1999 Calcutta) was the second President of the Sri Sarada Math and the Ramakrishna Sarada Mission. In Hinduism, Sri Sarada Math is the monastic order for women established as an independent counterpart to the Ramakrishna Order.

During her long tenure of twenty-six years of spiritual ministration, she initiated thousands of people, guiding them to lead a spiritual life. Before she became President of the Sri Sarada Math, she was headmistress of Sister Nivedita’s Girls’ School from 1946 to 1948.  She had an ardent interest in providing education for women as envisaged by Swami Vivekananda. Bold and fearless, she encouraged other women to be fearless and self-confident. Swami Premeshananda, the then monastic head of Ramakrishna Mission Sevashrama at Sargachi met her at Nivedita School and later wrote to her, 'The very sight of you has raised such high hopes in me that I rejoice at the prospect that through you we may at last give effect to our long long cherished vow of bringing about women's emancipation.'

After Sri Sarada Math and the Ramakrishna Sarada Mission were established, Pravrajika Mokshaprana became the Vice President and the Secretary and Headmistress of Shiksha Mandir, a branch centre of the Ramakrishna Sarada Mission at Baruipara in Kolkata. She thought of the students as her chosen ideal and was able to identify with them. The children responded to her faith in them.
Under Pravrajika Mokshaprana the expansion of Sri Sarada Math and the Ramakrishna Sarada Mission which had started in the time of Pravrajika Bharatiprana continued to spread. New centres came up in Arunachal Pradesh, Pune, Bangalore, Trivandrum, Indore, Bhuvaneswar, Haridwar, Almora and one in far off Australia. New Mission centres were opened in the rural areas of West Bengal like Burdwan, Midnapore and 24 Parganas and Siriti in Kolkata.

As President, she visited all the branch centers in India giving initiation to many and spreading the message of Sri Ramakrishna, Sri Sarada Devi and Swami Vivekananda. Whenever she visited a centre she created an atmosphere of a joyful festival to which the devotees looked forward each year.
Pravrajika Mokshaprana’s life was distinguished by her learning and discipline. Her articles and lectures were published in the journals of the Order. A voracious reader, she studied the scriptures as well as other books about the world History and its trends. She was interested in a variety of subjects such as literature, astronomy, geography and philosophy. She enjoyed discussions with the scholars and distinguished litterateurs who visited her regularly. Her compassionate heart attracted many souls from far and near. Whether tribal children of Northeast India, scholars from America or probationers of the Math, everyone received her motherly love and inspiration.

Early life
Renuka Basu as she was known in her earlier days was born on 9 December 1915 to Brajendra Nath Basu and Pankajkumari Devi - a middle-class family of North Calcutta. Brajendranath was an employee of Calcutta Corporation and wanted to give his children including Renuka a decent education. In childhood she visited Dakshineswar Temple and Kankurgachi Yogodyan, both places bearing the memories of the life and work of Sri Ramakrishna. After her father died Renu moved to her maternal uncles' house in Rajabazar with her family. Her uncle Dr. Satyesh Chandra Mitra first introduced Renu to Ramakrishna Mission and Belur Math. She came in intimate contact with Mahapurush Maharaj or Swami Shivananda, a direct disciple of Sri Ramakrishna. She was initiated into spiritual life by Swami Vijnanananda, a direct disciple of Sri Ramakrishna in 1935.
In 1942 she passed Master of Arts in ancient Indian history and decided to lead a life of celibacy. In 1946 she joined Nivedita School as the headmistress at the behest of Swami Nirvedananda, who was a leading monk of the Ramakrishna Order and the head of Ramakrishna Mission Students Home, Belgharia. She was later given the post of secretary of the same school in 1949.

Travel
She traveled to Benaras, to Kankhal and to South India and Ceylone during this period. She also traveled to Kashmir. She met many veteran Sannyasins of Ramakrishna Order including Swami Atulananda or Gurudas Maharaj in Ramakrishna Mission Sevashrama, Kankhal who was a direct disciple of Swami Turiyananda, Swami Jagadananda, Swami Vishuddhananda, Swami Virajananda, Swami Shankarananda, Swami Shantananda and others.

As Brahmacharini in Sri Sarada Math

In 1953, on the occasion of the birth centenary of Holy Mother Sri Sarada Devi, a group of seven dedicated workers of Nivedita School and other affiliated organizations like Matribhavan were given the vow of celibacy or Brahmacharya and Renu was one of them. During this period Renu had several letters from many renowned monks of Ramakrishna Order including Swami Premeshananda, the head of Ramakrishna Mission Sevashrama, Sargachi. She relinquished her posts in Nivedita school and joined Sarala, later known as Pravrajika Bharatiprana, the first president of Sri Sarada Math, as a spiritual inmate of the newly established Math. The new monastery was formed in Dakshineswar and Renuka was one of the dedicated workers. In 1959 she received the vow of Sannyas from Swami Shankarananda, the then president of Belur Math, and became known as Pravrajika Mokshaprana.

As Sannyasin in Sri Sarada Math
Mokshaprana Mataji was elected as a trustee of Sri Sarada Math in 1959 and in 1960 she became the vice president of the Math and the Mission. She personally supervised the construction of a degree college, Vivekananda college in Dumdum, under Ramakrishna Sarada Mission. She had knowledge of Homeopathy and she established a charitable dispensary in Dakshineswar which was frequented by the local people and this helped Sri Sarada Math to garner local support for its activities. In 1962 Ramakrishna Siksha Mandir, the second branch of Ramakrishna Sarada Mission was established in Baruipara Lane near Alambazar. It constituted a day care, a junior basic school and a mother teachers' training centre. Mokshaprana Mataji was the head of this centre and she built it and made it environment friendly as well as fit for children. She herself went to the localities to get students for the school. She took classes for the mothers of the children and also local women. She established Saradamani Pathshala for taking care of educational needs of underprivileged kids with the help of the mother teachers. She also began teaching extra curricular activities like music, drawing, painting, dancing, sewing etc. to make the mother teachers financially independent and sold the wares produced by them to make them and the ashram self-sufficient.

President, Sri Sarada Math
In 1973 she became the second president of Sri Sarada Math and Ramakrishna Sarada Mission after passing away of Pravrajika Bharatiprana. She had laid great emphasis on discipline with love. She also ensured the spiritual growth and development of the new Brahmacharins and Sannyasins in the monastery. Her quotations - We have come here for the work of the Holy Trio, believe this with all your might. One should forego any ego as that is dangerous for an aspirant. Do not try to judge anybody, whatever is happening, become a silent witness. If you do not like anybody, do not hate or demean him or her. Your God has brought him or her here, do not forget that." As the monastery head she looked after every affair of the Math and ensured that the core ideology was preserved. Under her stewardship Sri Sarada Math and Ramakrishna Sarada Mission rapidly expanded.
 On 14 February 1975 Sri Sarada Math branch centre was opened in Pune.
 On 8 March 1975 the foundation block of the Sri Sarada Math temple was laid by Swami Vireswarananda in Dakshineswar
 On 12 November 1975 the Prayer Hall was inaugurated in Trissur on the day of Jagaddhatri Puja
 In March 1980 first publishing of Samvit, the English magazine of Sri Sarada Math from Delhi
 On 12 August 1981 dedication of the newly formed building and prayer hall in Bangalore Sri Sarada Math 
 On 6 November 1981 inauguration of the temple in Sri Sarada Math by Swami Vireswarananda
 On 15 December 1985 dedication of the building in Sri Sarada Math Bhubaneswar
 In 1987 started the journey of Bengali magazine Nibodhata, published from Sri Sarada Math Dakshineswar
 On 22 March 1991, starting a new branch centre in Indore for Sri Sarada Math
 In 1992 started the new charitable dispensary in Dakshineswar
 On 3 April 1993 a new building of Sri Sarada Math was dedicated in Varanasi
 In 1994 Sri Sarada Math and Ramakrishna Sarada Mission celebrated the 100th anniversary of Swami Vivekananda's lectures in Chicago
 In 1998 a new branch was inaugurated in Siriti in Kolkata
 In 1999 the centenary celebration of Nivedita School was performed

New centres came up in Arunachal Pradesh, Pune, Bangalore, Trivandrum, Indore, Bhuvaneswar, Haridwar, Almora and one in far off Australia. New Mission centres were opened in the rural areas of West Bengal like Burdwan, Midnapore and 24 Parganas.
She stayed at the helm for 26 years till her passing away in 1999. She initiated many devotees. Many learned and educated people were influenced by her and they include Amzad Ali Khan, the famous Sitarist, Ustad Ali Akbar Khan, whose wife Zubeida Khan was her disciple, Ashish Khan, noted Sitarist, Sanjib Chattopadhyay, noted Bengali novelist, Nimaisadhan Basu, academic and historian, Harsha Dutta, noted journalist, J.B Kripalani, famous politician and others. She was a student of ancient history and she was a voracious reader of all subjects including literature, astronomy, geography and philosophy.

She was bold and fearless. During Naxal movement in 1960s in Bengal when her school was attacked she herself confronted the armed attackers. She helped and inspired many people, monastics and lay devotees alike to take up the ideals of Sri Ramakrishna, Sri Sarada Devi and Swami Vivekananda.

Last Days
In November 1998 she was diagnosed with cancer. She kept her active life and her last initiation was on 18 July 1998. She died on 30 August 1999. A leading Bengali daily Anandabazar Patrika reported that many dignitaries and lay devotees had come to see her last rites despite rainy weather to pay their respect. She was 83 years in age.

References

External links
 Website of Sri Sarada Math

1915 births
1999 deaths
Women school principals and headteachers
Scholars from Kolkata